St. Henry is an unincorporated community in Sharon Township, Le Sueur County, Minnesota, United States.

The community is located along State Highway 112 (MN 112) near its junction with 261st Avenue / Silver Lake Road (County 112).

Nearby places include Le Center, Le Sueur, Cleveland, Lexington, and Ottawa.

ZIP codes 56057 (Le Center) and 56058 (Le Sueur) meet near St. Henry.

The community is named for the Catholic church built by its first settlers.  Its post office operated from 1870 to 1877, and 1880 to 1902.

References

Unincorporated communities in Minnesota
Unincorporated communities in Le Sueur County, Minnesota
1870 establishments in Minnesota